25 Hill is a 2011 drama film about the All-American Soap Box Derby, the championships of which are held each July in Akron, Ohio, written and directed by Corbin Bernsen. It stars Nathan Gamble, Corbin Bernsen, Maureen Flannigan, and Ralph Waite.

Plot
12 year-old Trey Caldwell (Nathan Gamble) is shattered when his soldier father is killed in Afghanistan, leaving a hole in the boy's life – and an unfinished Soap Box Derby car in the garage. A final gift from his dad, the car is a constant reminder of all that could have been. But when Trey meets Roy Gibbs (Corbin Bernsen), a grizzled Fire Chief devastated by the loss of his firefighter son on 9/11, a new relationship forms and old wounds finally begin to heal. As the unlikely team works to complete the Soap Box car and train for the upcoming Derby, they'll learn that life isn't about the starting line or checkered flag – it's about having the courage to make the incredible journey of faith in between.

Cast
Nathan Gamble as Trey Caldwell, a boy who has no interest in derby racing.
Corbin Bernsen as Roy Gibbs, a man who helps Trey build his derby cart.
Maureen Flannigan as Maggie Caldwell, Trey's mom, who supports him.
Ralph Waite as Ed, a man who helps Trey.
Timothy Omundson as Thomas Caldwell, Trey's dad.
Bailee Madison as Kate Slater, Trey's nemesis.
Brad Raider as Derek Slater, Kate's father.
Andrew Nelisse, Todd Hinton and Scott Sherwood as "Team Slater"
Jim Clark, Western Regional Track Announcer

Production

Filming
Filming started in Akron, Ohio on April 7, 2010, and went into post-production on August 13.

References

External links

American drama films
2010s English-language films
Films shot in Ohio
Films directed by Corbin Bernsen
2011 films
American auto racing films
Films about orphans
Films set in Akron, Ohio
2011 drama films
2010s American films